This is a timeline of Bulgarian history.

Prior to 1st century

1st–6th centuries

7th century

8th century

9th century

10th century

11th century

12th century

13th century

14th century

15th century

16th century

17th century

18th century

19th century

20th century

21st century

See also 
Bulgaria
History of Bulgaria
Timeline of Sofia
Timeline of Plovdiv
Timeline of Varna
List of Bulgarian monarchs

References 

Timelines by country